The acronym CCLS may refer to:

 Carver County Library System
  Central California Legal Services
 Centre for Commercial Law Studies
 Chattooga County Library System
 Chester County Library System
 Christ Community Lutheran School
 Clayton County Library System
 Coca Cola Light Sango
 Consumer Credit Legal Service (WA)